Several ships of the French Navy have been named in honour of Anne Hilarion de Tourville. Among them: 
 , a   74-gun ship of the line (1790-1833)
 , a Spanish 86-gun ship of the line ceded to France, bore the name Tourville from 1811 to 1816
 , an 80-gun ship of the line (1853-1872)
 , an unprotected cruiser built in the 1870s
 An unbuilt  (1914) 
 , a heavy cruiser  (1928-1962)
 , a F67 type frigate.
 A Barracuda-class submarine is scheduled to bear the name

French Navy ship names